The Italian Catholic Diocese of San Marino-Montefeltro was until 1977 the historic Diocese of Montefeltro. It is a Latin suffragan of the Archdiocese of Ravenna-Cervia. The current diocese includes all the parishes of San Marino.

It has its collegiate cathedral episcopal see S. Bartolomeo, dedicated to the Apostle St. Bartholomew, in Pennabilli, Rimini, Emilia Romagna, and two Co-Cathedrals :
 the church of San Leo, located in the nearby Italian town of that name, once the cathedral of the former see.
 the Basilica di San Marino, in the City of San Marino. This is a Minor Basilica and World Heritage Site.

History 

The earliest mention of Montefeltro, as Mona Feretri, is in the diplomas by which first Holy Roman Emperor Charlemagne confirmed the donation of Pepin. In 785 the bishopric was established as Diocese of Montefeltro. 
The first known bishop of Montefeltro was Agatho (826), whose residence was at San Leo.

Under Bishop Flaminios Dondi (1724) the see was again transferred to San Leo, but later it returned to Pennabilli. The historic diocese was a suffragan of the Roman Catholic Archdiocese of Urbino.

On 22 February 1977, it was renamed as Diocese of San Marino–Montefeltro, having lost territory to the Diocese of Sarsina, and exchanged territory with the Diocese of Rimini.

It enjoyed Papal visits from Pope John Paul II in August 1982 and Pope Benedict XVI in June 2012.

On Tuesday, 18 September 2012, Pope Benedict XVI appointed the bishop of San Marino-Montefeltro, Bishop Luigi Negri, to serve as one of the Synod Fathers for the upcoming October 2012 13th Ordinary General Assembly of the Synod of Bishops on the New Evangelization.

Bishops 
(incomplete; sometimes sources contradict; all Roman Rite)

Diocese of Montefeltro
Latin Name: Feretrana (seu Montis Feltri)
Erected: 9th Century
Metropolitan: Archdiocese of Urbino

 Agatho (826), whose residence was at San Leo.
 ...
 Arduino (1015–1044)
 Adolfo (1053–1074)
 Gebizone (1075–1079)
 Pietro Carpegna (?–1125?)
 Arnoldo (1140–1154)
 Gualfredo (?–1172?)
 Valentino (1173), who finished the cathedral
 Alberto (1206–1208)
 Giovanni (1218–1221?)
 ? Benvenuto (1219), deposed as a partisan of Count Ederigo
 Rolando (1222–1229)
 Ugolino (1232–1252)
 Giovanni (1252–1275)
 Roberto da Montefeltro (1282–1284)
 Liberto (1286–1311)
 Benvenuto (1318–1347)
 Claro Peruzzi (1349–1375)
 Pietro, Augustinian Order (O.E.S.A.) (1378–1385?)
 Benedetto di Salnucio (1390–1408), Benedictines (O.S.B.), rector of Romagna and Duke of Spoleto
 Giovanni Sedani, Friars Minor (O.F.M.) (1409 – 1444.09.28), who built (circa 1413) the episcopal palace of Calamello
 Francesco da Chiaravalle (1445.01.24 – 1450)
 Giacomo Tebaldi (1450.06.05 – 1456.12.17), created Cardinal-Priest of S. Anastasia (1457.01.24 – death 1466.09.04), Camerlengo of Sacred College of Cardinals (1458–1459), Metropolitan Archbishop of Napoli (Naples) (Italy) (1458.08.03 – 1458.11)
 Andrea (1456.11 – 1458)
 Corrado Marcellino (1458.08.12 – 1458.10.06), later Bishop of Sezze (Italy) (1458.10.06 – 1490)
 Giacomo da Foglia (1458.10.27 – ?)
 Roberto degli Adimari (1459.04.26 – 1484.10.01)
 Celso Mellini (1484.10.01 – death 1498)
 Luca Mellini (1498.11.21 – death 1507)
 Antonio Castriani, O.F.M. (21 May 1507 – death 11 August 1510), previously Bishop of Fossombrone (Italy) (1506.01.30 – 1507.05.21)
 Paolo Alessandri degli Strabuzzi (1510.10 – death 1538)
 Ennio Filonardi (1538.08.12 – death 1549.12.19), previously Bishop of Veroli (Italy) (1503.08.04 – 1538.08.12), created Cardinal-Priest of S. Angelo in Pescheria as pro hac vice Title (1537.01.15 – 1546.10.08); later promoted Cardinal-Bishop of Albano (1546.10.08 – 1549.12.19)
 Ennio Massari Filonardi (1549 – death 1565)
 Carlo Visconti  (6 July 1565 – death 12 November 1565), previously Bishop of Ventimiglia (Italy) (1561.12.05 – 1565.07.06), created Cardinal-Priest of Ss. Vito e Modesto in Macello Martyrum pro hac vice Title (1565.05.15 – 1565.11.12)
 Giovanni Francesco Sormani (or Sarmani; 6 March 1567 – death 1601), founder of the seminary of Pennabilli, thenceforth residence of the bishops, the episcopal see having been transferred there.
 Pietro Cartolari (29 November 1601 – death 1607)
 Consalvo Duranti (19 March 1607 – death 10 January 1643)
 Bernardino Scala (28 May 1643 – death 19 January 1667), previously Bishop of Bisceglie (Italy) (1637.01.12 – 1643.05.28)
 Antonio Possenti (3 August 1667 – death 14 December 1671)
 Giacomo Buoni  (8 February 1672 – 28 February 1678), later Bishop of Nepi e Sutri (1678.02.25 – death 1679)
 Bernardino Belluzzi  (5 September 1678- 25 September 1702), later Bishop of Camerino (Italy) (1702.09.25 – death 1719.02.15)
 Pietro Valerio Martorelli  (5 March 1703 – 18 November 1724)
 Flaminio Dondi, O.F.M. (20 November 1724 – death 12 August 1729), previously Titular Bishop of Abdera (1717.04.12 – 1724.11.20) & Auxiliary Bishop of Sabina (Italy) (1717.04.12 – 1724.11.20)
 Giovanni Crisostomo Calvi, Dominican Order (O.P. (7 September 1729 – death 27 April 1747), previously Bishop of Roman Catholic Diocese of Kefalonia–Zakynthos (insular Greece; 1718.05.11 – 1729.09.07)
 Sebastiano Bonaiuti (29 May 1747 – death 27 February 1765)
 Giovanni Pergolini (22 April 1765 – 17 February 1777), later Bishop of Urbania e Sant'Angelo in Vado (Italy) (1777.02.17 – 1779.08) 
 Giuseppe Maria Terzi (17 February 1777 – death 27 October 1803)
 Antonio Begni (28 May 1804 – death 11 June 1840)
 Antonio Benedetto Antonucci (17 December 1840 – 22 July 1842), previously Ecclesiastical Superior of Mission sui iuris of Batavia ('Dutch Mission', northern Netherlands) (1831 – 1840.12.17); later Bishop of Ferentino (Italy) (1842.07.22 – 1844.07.25), Titular Archbishop of Tarsus (1844.07.25 – 1851.09.05), Archbishop-Bishop of Ancona e Umana (Italy) (1851.09.05 – 1879.01.29), created Cardinal-Priest of S. Martino ai Monti (1858.03.18 – death 1879.01.29)
 Salvatore Leziroli (22 July 1842 – 20 January 1845), later Bishop of Rimini (Italy) (1845.01.20 – death 1863)
 Martino Caliendi (21 April 1845 – death 1849), previously Bishop of Ripatransone (Italy) (1842.01.27 – 1845.04.21)
 Crispino Agostinucci (5 November 1849 – death 1856)
 Elia Antonio Alberini, Discalced Carmelites (O.C.D.) (16 June 1856 – 23 March 1860), later Bishop of Ascoli Piceno (Italy) (1860.03.23 – death 1876)
 Luigi Mariotti (23 March 1860 – death 1890)
 Carlo Bonaiuti (23 Jun 1890 – 22 June 1896), later Bishop of Pesaro (Italy) (1896.06.22 – death 1904)
 Alfonso Andreoli (6 December 1896 – 20 December 1911), later Bishop of Loreto (Italy) (1911.12.20 – 1923.11.10), Bishop of Recanati(Italy) (1911.12.20 – death 1923.11.10)
 Raffaele Santi (22 April 1912 – 15 June 1940), emeritate as Titular Archbishop of Oxyrynchus (1940.06.15 – death 1944.01.28)
 Vittorio De Zanche (9 August 1940  – 25 September 1949), later Bishop of Concordia (Italy) (1949.09.25 – 1971.01.12), restyled Bishop of Concordia–Pordenone (Italy) (1971.01.12 – death 1977.04.14)
 Antonio Bergamaschi (12 December 1949  – death 17 April 1966)
 Apostolic Administrator Emilio Biancheri (1966 – 1977.02.22), while Bishop of Rimini (Italy) (1953.09.07 – 1976.12.17) and next on emeritate

Diocese of San Marino-Montefeltro
Name Changed: 22 February 1977
Latin Name: Sammarinensis-Feretrana
Metropolitan: Archdiocese of Ravenna-Cervia

 Giovanni Locatelli (22 February 1977  - 12 November 1988), previously Bishop of Rimini (Italy) (1977.02.22 – 1988.11.12); later Bishop of Vigevano (Italy) (1988.11.12 – retired 2000.03.18)
 Mariano De Nicolò (8 July 1989  - 25 May 1995), previously Papal Master of Ceremonies of Office for Pontifical Ceremonies (1967 – 1984), Undersecretary of Pontifical Council for the Interpretation of Legislative Texts (1984 – 1989.07.08); later Bishop of Rimini (Italy) (1989.07.08 – retired 2007.07.03)
 Paolo Rabitti (25 May 1995  - 2 October 2004), previously Undersecretary of Pontifical Commission for Preserving the Church’s Patrimony of Art and History (1989 – 1993), Secretary of Pontifical Commission for the Cultural Heritage of the Church (1993 – 1995.05.25); later Archbishop of Ferrara-Comacchio (Italy) (2004.10.02 – retired 2012.12.01)
 Luigi Negri (17 March 2005 - 1 December 2012), later Archbishop of Ferrara-Comacchio  (2012.12.01 – ...)
 Andrea Turazzi (30 November 2013 - ...)

See also 
 Roman Catholicism in San Marino

Notes

Sources and external links
 GCatholic with incumbent bio links

Roman Catholic dioceses in le Marche
Catholic Church in San Marino
Dioceses established in the 9th century